Plamena Mitkova (born 18 September 2004) is a Bulgarian track and field athlete who won the long jump at the World Jumior Athletics Championships in 2022.

Career
Mitkova won the Bulgarian national title in July 2022, jumping 6.19m in the Stadion Ivaylo in Veliko Tarnovo. In August,  2022 Mitkova triumphed in the long jump at the World Jumior Athletics Championships, jumping a personal best 6.66m.

Personal life
Mitkova originates from Plovdiv, Bulgaria’s second largest city.

References

External Links

2004 births
Living people
Bulgarian female long jumpers
World Athletics U20 Championships winners
Sportspeople from Plovdiv